The Estonian Kosovo Contingent or (simply Kosovo Contingent) is a joint military force of the Estonian Defence Forces deployed in northern Kosovo, in the area of Kosovska Mitrovica.

History 

Estonia has participated on different Kosovo missions since 1999 when the first unit, ESTPATROL-1, part of the Kosovo Force (KFOR) forces in the region, became operational. From 1999 to 2006 a total of 14 Estonian units served in Kosovo. From 2003 to 2006 a joint Baltic infantry company BALTSQN also rotated in Kosovo. Since February 2007 Estonia is once again rotating on Kosovo mission with a platoon size unit.

Current deployments 
This the order of battle of the known units that are operating within the Estonian Kosovo Contingent:
 ESTRIF scout platoon unit
 staff and signal unit

Former deployments 
This the order of battle of the known units that have operated within the Estonian Kosovo Contingent:

 ESTPATROL-14 
 ESTPATROL-13 
 ESTPATROL-12
 ESTPATROL-11
 ESTPATROL-10
 ESTPATROL-9
 ESTPATROL-8
 ESTPATROL-7
 ESTPATROL-6
 ESTPATROL-5
 ESTPATROL-4
 ESTPATROL-3
 ESTPATROL-2
 ESTPATROL-1

 BALTSQN-13
 BALTSQN-10
 BALTSQN-7

See also 
KFOR - Kosovo Force
Estonian Iraqi Contingent
Estonian Afghanistan Contingent
List of Estonian Contingencies

References 

Military units and formations of Estonia
Military units and formations established in 2003